Marcos Paulo Gelmini Gomes (born 13 July 1988), known as Marcos Paulo, is a Brazilian professional footballer who plays for Portuguese club S.C. Farense as a midfielder. He also holds Italian nationality.

Club career
Born in Pedro Leopoldo, Minas Gerais, Marcos Paulo played with Venda Nova Futebol Clube and Associação Atlética Caldense in his country. In January 2008, he was signed by Ligue 1 side Le Mans Union Club 72.

During his two-and-a-half-year spell in France, Paulo was almost exclusively associated with the club's reserve team. He made his league debut on 18 April 2009, playing 17 minutes in a game against Valenciennes FC (2–0 away win).

Marcos Paulo spent the following seasons competing in Portugal's Primeira Liga, with U.D. Leiria and Académica de Coimbra. On 29 July 2015, he signed a two-year contract with Super League Greece club Panetolikos F.C. for an undisclosed fee.

References

External links
 

1988 births
Living people
People from Pedro Leopoldo
Brazilian people of Italian descent
Citizens of Italy through descent
Sportspeople from Minas Gerais
Brazilian footballers
Association football midfielders
Ligue 1 players
Le Mans FC players
Primeira Liga players
Liga Portugal 2 players
U.D. Leiria players
Associação Académica de Coimbra – O.A.F. players
F.C. Vizela players
S.C. Farense players
Super League Greece players
Panetolikos F.C. players
Brazilian expatriate footballers
Expatriate footballers in France
Expatriate footballers in Portugal
Expatriate footballers in Greece
Brazilian expatriate sportspeople in France
Brazilian expatriate sportspeople in Portugal
Brazilian expatriate sportspeople in Greece